This article documents the discography of American country artist Bonnie Guitar.

Studio albums

1950s and 1960s

1970s and 1980s

Holiday albums

Compilation albums

Singles

1950s

1960s

1970s and 1980s

Other songs

Holiday singles

Music videos

Notes 
A^ "Born to Be with You" was credited with Don Robertson as "The Echoes". 
B^ "Still the Same" was included as a bonus track on the digital release of What Can I Say.

References 

Discographies of American artists
Country music discographies